Tanishq is an Indian jewellery brand and a division of Titan Company. Founded in 1994, Tanishq is headquartered in Bangalore, and has 410 retail stores across more than 240 cities.

History 

By the end of the 1980s, Titan launched Tanishq, focused largely on exports to European and American markets, in an attempt to increase its foreign exchange reserves. In the early 1990s, India's exchange crisis was resolved, and Titan Company shifted the focus of the brand to Indian market. A pilot plant was set up in August 1992 and the production began in 1994, and Tanishq's first store opened in 1996. Tanishq was the first jewellery retail chain in India.

The first years of Tanishq recorded consistent losses. In 2000, Managing Director Xerxes Desai chose Bhaskar Bhat to succeed him. Starting in 2000, its net worth started to grow, and by 2003, Tanishq was among the top 5 retailers in India, and made up 40% of the Titan Company's revenue.

In the early 2000s, Tanishq opened stores internationally, in the Middle East and in the United States (Chicago and New Jersey), but closed them before the end of the decade.

Tanishq made the beauty pageant crowns for the Femina Miss India 2007. By 2008, Tanishq had 105 stores in 71 cities in India. In 2011, the Tanishq group launched the sub-brand called Mia for working women. In November 2012, Tanishq reached a landmark when it opened its 150th showroom in India

In April 2014, the brand started to export to the United Arab Emirates. In July 2014, Tanishq announced it ceased its gold deposit schemes to comply with the Companies Act 2013, schemes that enabled its clients to save up to buy gold, but launched it back just a few months later in a format that complied with the new laws.

By December 2022, Tanishq had 385 retail stores nationwide, and announced the opening of 45-50 stores by the end of 2023.

In 2017, Tanishq launched a sub-brand called Rivaah targeting the wedding segment. In January 2017, the Titan group merged its Gold Plus stores with the larger Tanishq retail brand. In April 2017, Tanishq launched the sub-brand Mirayah to cater to women under their 40s. In December 2017, Tanishq launched the Aveer line, its first line of products for men.

In 2023, the brand opened its U.S. flagship store on Oak Tree Road, a popular East Coast shopping district for South Asian goods and services.

Activities 

Tanishq is a brand of jewellery retail stores in India. The brand is the property of Titan Company, which is back by Tata Group and TIDCO.

The name Tanishq was chosen by Titan's first managing director Xerxes Desai. The name was formed by combining the first two letters from "Tan" (means body) and निष्क "NIṢK" (meaning gold coin or necklace in Sanskrit), although the क k has been modified into a क़ q. According to another sources, the name is formed with the two words Tan (body) and Nishk (gold ornament) in the Sanskrit language, a name synonymous to superior craftsmen or absolute design.

Controversies
In October 2020, a Tanishq commercial depicting an interfaith couple's baby shower sparked controversy on social media. As calls for a boycott intensified, the company stated that it had withdrawn the ad "keeping in mind hurt sentiments & well being of our employees". A month later, it withdrew another ad which had called for Diwali to be celebrated without firecrackers, owing to criticism on social media.

References

External links
 Official website

Design companies established in 1994
Luxury brands
Companies based in Bangalore
Indian jewellery designers
Indian brands
Jewellery retailers of India
Jewellery companies of India
Titan Company
1984 establishments in Karnataka